Jackson Kitali (1924 - July 25, 2002) was a politician from Moshi, Tanzania.

Career & Life
He unsuccessfully contested in the elections of Paramount Chief (Mangi Mkuu) of the Chaga in 1952, for which Chief Thomas Marealle of Marangu won. In his political career in Independent Tanzania, he held various political posts in the ruling party TANU (now CCM) such as Moshi District Chairman in the 1970s.

He died on 25 July 2002, at the age of 78, and is buried at his homeplace in Tella, Moshi. He was survived by his wife and ten children.

References

1924 births
2002 deaths
Chama Cha Mapinduzi politicians